The 2017 Gasparilla Bowl was a college football bowl game played on December 21, 2017, at Tropicana Field in St. Petersburg, Florida.  The tenth edition of the game previously known as the St. Petersburg Bowl, it featured the Temple Owls of the American Athletic Conference against the FIU Panthers of Conference USA.  It began at 8:00 PM EST and aired on ESPN.  It was one of the 2017–18 bowl games that concluded the 2017 FBS football season. The Owls defeated the Panthers by a score of 28–3.

This was the first edition of the bowl to use the Gasparilla naming, a nod to the legend of José Gaspar, a mythical pirate who is the inspiration for Tampa's Gasparilla Pirate Festival. Sponsored by lawnmower manufacturing company Bad Boy Mowers, the game was officially known as the Bad Boy Mowers Gasparilla Bowl. This was the last edition of the bowl played at Tropicana Field.

Teams
The game featured the Temple Owls against the FIU Panthers and was the first-ever meeting between the two schools.

Temple Owls

This was Temple's first Gasparilla Bowl and the third consecutive (and seventh overall) bowl game for the Owls, extending the longest bowl streak in school history.

FIU Panthers

This was FIU's third bowl game in school history and second Gasparilla Bowl; the Panthers had previously played in the 2011 game (when it was known as the Beef 'O' Brady's Bowl), losing to Marshall by a score of 20–10.  That game was the most recent bowl that the Panthers had appeared in prior to this Gasparilla Bowl, which snapped their five-year streak of not appearing in a bowl.

Game summary

Scoring summary

Statistics

Source:

References

External links
Box score at ESPN

2017–18 NCAA football bowl games
2017
2017
2017
21st century in St. Petersburg, Florida
2017 in sports in Florida
December 2017 sports events in the United States